Thottikallu is a place near Bangalore off the Kanakapura road in the Bangalore Urban district which is famous for a falls called Thottikallu falls, more popularly known as TK falls. It is also known as 'SwarnaMukhi' water falls. SwarnaMukhi  translates as 'Golden-Faced'. The route at Kagalpura (Kaggalipura) off the Bangalore - Kanakapura road will lead to a place called Byalemaradadoddi, from where a mud road leads to the falls. The place also has a small shrine.

Tourism

There is no entry to the Falls as it belongs to Karnataka Forest Department and is considered as an elephant corridor  hence its protected  and entry of tourists  is banned and trespassing are fined heavily. Thottikallu Falls  belongs to Forest  Department entry into the Falls is banned and trespassing will be fined heavily.

References

Waterfalls of Karnataka
Tourist attractions in Bangalore
Geography of Bangalore Rural district
Hindu temples in Bangalore Rural district